Výhledy (German: Steingrün) is a village in Karlovy Vary Region, Czech Republic. It is one of the six municipality districts of Hazlov. In 2001, the village had a population of 37.

Geography 
Výhledy lies 4 kilometres north of Hazlov, about 687 meters above sea level. It is surrounded by forests. It neighbour Skalka to the south and Nebesa and Nový Žďár to the southwest. To the west and the east, there is the German border.

A spring of Bílý Halštrov river is located over the village.

History 
Skalka was first mentioned in 1224. From 1629, the village was part of Hazlov, and in 1850 it created its municipality with the village Neuengrün (which no longer exists).

In the 14th century, a small stronghold was located in the village but was destroyed a long time ago. In 1890 a modern (at that time) school was built here, but it is no longer used.

Landmarks 
 Calvary with Most Holy Trinity motive,
 iron crucifix,
 World War I memorial (in very bad condition).

Gallery

References 

Hazlov
Villages in Cheb District